Paul-Émile Charbonneau (May 4, 1922 – May 21, 2014) was a Canadian Prelate of Catholic Church.

Charbonneau was born in Sainte-Thérèse, Quebec and was ordained a priest on May 31, 1947. Charbonneau was appointed auxiliary archbishop to the Archdiocese of Ottawa as well as titular bishop of Thapsus on November 15, 1960 and consecrated on January 18, 1961. Charbonneau was appointed bishop of the Archdiocese of Gatineau on March 21, 1963 and resigned April 12, 1973. He died on May 21, 2014.

References

External links
Catholic-Hierarchy
Ottawa Archdiocese
Diocese of Gatineau (French)

1922 births
2014 deaths
20th-century Roman Catholic bishops in Canada
21st-century Roman Catholic bishops in Canada
Participants in the Second Vatican Council
People from Sainte-Thérèse, Quebec
Roman Catholic bishops of Gatineau
Roman Catholic bishops of Ottawa–Cornwall